Richard P. Appelbaum (born June 6, 1942) is an American sociologist. He is Distinguished Professor Emeritus and former MacArthur Foundation Chair in Global and International Studies and Sociology at the University of California, Santa Barbara, and currently a professor at Fielding Graduate University.

Biography 
Appelbaum was born on June 6, 1942, in Rochester, New York. He received his B.A. from Columbia University, M.P.A. from the Princeton School of Public and International Affairs, and PhD from the University of Chicago. His scholarship has focused on the globalization of business, and the sociology of work and labor. His most recent research has focused on innovation policy in China and the global supply-chain network.

Appelbaum held visiting professorships at the University of Manchester and the University of Hong Kong. He is the research group leader of the Center for Nanotechnology in Society.

He was the founding editor of the sociological journal Competition & Change and co-author of the textbook Introduction to Sociology, now in its 11th edition.

He was elected a fellow of the American Association for the Advancement of Science in 2011.

References 

Living people
University of California, Santa Barbara faculty
Columbia College (New York) alumni
Princeton University alumni
University of Chicago alumni
Fielding Graduate University faculty
Academics from New York (state)
American sociologists
Academics of the University of Manchester
Academic staff of the University of Hong Kong
Fellows of the American Association for the Advancement of Science
1942 births